The Belfast West by-election 1943, was a  by-election held on 9 February 1943 for the British House of Commons constituency of Belfast West, in Northern Ireland. The seat had become vacant when the sitting Unionist Member of Parliament (MP)  Alexander Browne had died in December 1942.

The winner was Northern Ireland Labour Party candidate Jack Beattie, a shock result in what had previously been a Unionist safe seat.

Results

References

External links 
A Vision Of Britain Through Time (Constituency elector numbers)

See also 
1950 Belfast West by-election
Belfast West (UK Parliament constituency)

1943 elections in the United Kingdom
West
20th century in Belfast
1943 elections in Northern Ireland